Alpha max or variation, may refer to:

 Critical angle of attack (α max), the highest nose-up attitude at speed before stalling
 An element in the mathematical algorithm Alpha max plus beta min algorithm
 AlphaMax Academy (founded 1998) a private international school in Suriname

See also

 
 
 
 
 Street Fighter Alpha 3 Max (videogame)
 Amax (disambiguation)
 alpha (disambiguation)
 max (disambiguation)